Chuva de Maio is a 1990 Portuguese musical television series broadcast by RTP. It has been rerun on RTP Memória.

Cast
António Pinto Basto as Rodrigo
Sofia Brito as Sara
José Arantes
João Baião
António Pinto Basto
Margarida Carpinteiro
Carmen Dolores
Curado Ribeiro
Laura Soveral

References

External links

1990s Portuguese television series
Musical television series
1990 Portuguese television series debuts
Rádio e Televisão de Portugal original programming